Burning at Both Ends (also known as Resistance 1942 in some territories) is a 2022 film set in Nazi occupied Vichy France, starring Cary Elwes, Jason Patric, Greer Grammer, Sebastian Roché and Judd Hirsch.

Plot
In Lyon, 1942 Jacques is radio broadcasting French Resistance in Vichy France but he and his family and friends must stay one step ahead of the Gestapo.

Cast
 Cary Elwes as Jacques
 Jason Patric as Andre
 Greer Grammer as Juliet
 Sebastian Roché as Klaus
 Judd Hirsch as Bertrand
 Gilles Marini as Inspector Rousseau
 Mira Furlan as Agnes
 Don Harvey as Freidrich

Production
The script was prize winning at the Movieguide Awards in 2014.
Elwes was originally announced be to starring alongside Matthew Modine when the production was revealed by Slingshot Productions in Los Angeles in March 2017, with filming expected to begin that spring. Judd Hirsch and Greer Grammar were also cast in March 2017.

Release
The picture was made available for digital download in the UK from January 10, 2022.

Reception
In a review entitled "Jason Patric smuggles quality into worthy war tale",
The Guardian said the film had "the kernel of a good idea" but the "timid film fails to fully capitalise on [the] uncomfortable scenario and misses opportunities elsewhere, instead going big on self-satisfied pieties about fighting the just fight." The performance of Patric as the morally ambiguous Andre is praised compared to Elwes "oddly detached" performance.

References

External links
 

2022 films
American World War II films
Anti-war films about World War II
Films about the French Resistance